The Sipora flying squirrel (Hylopetes sipora) is a species of rodent in the family Sciuridae. It is endemic to Indonesia. 
Its natural habitat is subtropical or tropical dry forests. It is threatened by habitat loss.

References

Mammals of Indonesia
Hylopetes
Mammals described in 1940
Taxa named by Frederick Nutter Chasen
Taxonomy articles created by Polbot